AladinTM, also known as adracalin, is a nuclear envelope protein that in humans is encoded by the AAAS gene. It is named after the achalasia–addisonianism–alacrima syndrome (triple A syndrome) which occurs when the gene is mutated.

Function 
Aladin  is a component of the nuclear pore complex, to which it is attached by nucleoporin NDC1.  Mutant aladin causes selective failure of nuclear protein import and hypersensitivity to oxidative stress.  Mutant aladin also causes decreased nuclear import of aprataxin, a repair protein for single-strand breaks, and DNA ligase I, employed in DNA base excision repair. These decreases in DNA repair proteins may increase the susceptibility of cells to oxidative stress by allowing accumulation of oxidative DNA damages that trigger cell death.

Clinical significance 
Mutations in the AAAS gene are responsible for Triple A syndrome (also known as Allgrove Syndrome).  Triple-A syndrome is an autosomal recessive neuroendocrinological disease.  

Aladin is also employed in specific oocyte meiotic stages, including spindle assembly and spindle positioning.   Female mice homozygously null for aladin are sterile.

References

Further reading

External links 
   
 

Nuclear pore complex